Davda is a panchayat village in the Indian state of Gujarat. It is part of Nadiad (rural) Taluka of Kheda district. It is nine kilometers west of the town of Nadiad. Davda has a branch Post Office with a sub-office in nearby Palana.

As of the census of 2011, there were 867 households in the village and its population was 4,005.  With a total area of 462.89 hectares (1143.82 acres), it had, in 2011, 407 hectares (1,006 acres) under cultivation, over 90% of which was irrigated land, through Mahi Kadana Irrigation network. There is significant income from fish culture in the village ponds, including Davda Lake.

Notes and references 

Villages in Kheda district